Wells Fargo Tower, part of the Palmer Center complex, is the tallest building in Colorado Springs, Colorado. Its construction was completed in 1990 and is located at 90 South Cascade Avenue. Before June 2000, the building was known as the Norwest Bank Tower.

References
Wells Fargo Tower, Colorado Springs / Emporis.com
Wells Fargo soon to arrive in Springs

Buildings and structures in Colorado Springs, Colorado
Skyscraper office buildings in Colorado
Skyscrapers in Colorado
Wells Fargo buildings
Kohn Pedersen Fox buildings
Office buildings completed in 1990